Alexandra ("Alexi") Spann (born October 21, 1986) is a female breaststroke swimmer from the United States, who won the gold medal in the women's 200m breaststroke event at the 2003 Pan American Games.

Spann is a native of Austin, Texas. Her father, Scott Spann, Sr., is a six-time US swimming champion and won the bronze medal in the 200m individual medley race at the 1979 Pan American Games in San Juan, Puerto Rico. Her brother, Scott Spann, Jr., was a member of the 2008 U.S. Olympic Team in the 200 m breaststroke.

External links
USA Swimming athlete bio: Alexi Spann
Texas Longhorns athlete bio: Alexi Spann

1986 births
Living people
American female swimmers
Sportspeople from Austin, Texas
Texas Longhorns women's swimmers
Swimmers at the 2003 Pan American Games
Pan American Games gold medalists for the United States
Pan American Games medalists in swimming
Medalists at the 2003 Pan American Games
21st-century American women